Comes with the Fall is the debut studio album by American rock band Comes with the Fall. It is the only album they recorded as a quartet with second guitarist Nico Constantine, who was also a member back when the band was known as Madfly. The album was recorded in Atlanta, Georgia, before the group relocated to Los Angeles, California, and released through William DuVall's DVL Records.

Track listing

Personnel

Comes with the Fall
Nico Constantine — guitar
Bevan Davies — drums
William DuVall — vocals, guitar
Adam Stanger — bass guitar

Production
Produced by William DuVall
Mixed by Robert Hannon, Russ Fowler
Mastered by Rodney Mills

References

2000 debut albums
Comes with the Fall albums